Scouting in Tasmania began in 1908 with several separate associations operating in the early years including the  Chums Scout Patrols, League of Boy Scouts, Girl Peace Scouts, British Boy Scouts and YMCA Scouts. These were later joined by The Boy Scouts Association, The Girl Guides Association and Life-Saving Scouts and Life Saving Guards of the Salvation Army. Some local groups of Scouts moved between associations. There has also been representation by the Baden-Powell Scouts' Association with a group of scouts in  Devonport under Alan Richmond, OAM affiliating in May 1984.

Scouting and Guiding in Tasmania is now predominantly represented by Scouts Australia's Tasmanian Branch and Girl Guides Australia's Tasmanian Branch.

The Scout Association Of Australia Tasmanian Branch 

The Scout Association Of Australia Tasmanian Branch is organised around several Scout Districts:

Clarence
Hellyer
Huon
Kingborough
Launceston and Tamar
Leven
Mersey
North Midlands
Wellington

and a District for Distant Groups.

The main adult training centre is the Lea Scout Centre, 8 km from Hobart. It also houses the Branch Headquarters and the Tasmanian Scout Heritage Centre opened in 1997. There are several other Activity Centres throughout the State.

History

Captain D. Colbron Pearse was Assistant Commandant at the Humshaugh Camp run by the publishers of The Scout magazine, C. Arthur Pearson Limited, in England in 1908. Pearse was working for Pearsons as an illustrator. Pearse moved to Tasmania in 1922 and was involved in Scouting for the rest of his life. In 1922, he was Publicity Manager for The Boy Scouts Association, Tasmanian Branch. In 1926 he was Assistant Chief Commissioner and welcomed Baden-Powell, the Chief Scout of The Boy Scouts Association, to Tasmania.

Girl Guides Tasmania

Girl Guides Tasmania is divided into 4 Regions 

 North West
 North "McIntyre" 
 South East
 South West

Guides Tasmania has two camp sites, Nindethana by the Tamar River near Launceston and Orana 20 km from Hobart.

Gang Shows

 Hobart Gang Show started in 1956; in recess between 1971 and 1990, located in Hobart, Tasmania.

References

External links
Scouts Australia (Tasmania) Branch
Girl Guides Tasmania

Tasmania, Scouting in